Viktor Örlygur Andrason (born 5 February 2000) is an Icelandic footballer who plays as a midfielder for Icelandic club Víkingur Reykjavík.

Club career 
Viktor made his senior debut with Víkingur Reykjavík in 2016, having come up through their youth sides.

International career 
Viktor made his debut with the Iceland national team in the friendly match against Uganda on 12 January 2022, playing the full 90 minutes.

Honours 
Víkingur Reykjavík
 Úrvalsdeild: 2021
 Icelandic Cup: 2019, 2021

References

External links

2000 births
Living people
Viktor Orlygur Andrason
Association football midfielders
Viktor Orlygur Andrason
Viktor Orlygur Andrason
Viktor Orlygur Andrason